Fcitx is an input method framework with extension support for the X Window System that supports multiple input method engines including Pinyin transcription, table-based input methods (e.g. Wubi method), fcitx-chewing for Traditional Chinese, fcitx-keyboard for layout-based ones, fcitx-mozc for Japanese, and fcitx-hangul for Korean.

It supports UTF-8, GBK and GB 18030 character encodings, can run in Linux and FreeBSD, and supports XIM protocol, GTK+ (both 2 and 3) and Qt input method modules.

Before version 3.6, Fcitx used GBK encoding internally, which has been changed to UTF-8 in the 4.0 release. Since version 4.1, it has become highly modular, and has added support for Google Pinyin (which was ported from the Android version), fbterm, and KDE. The license was changed in the 5.0 release, from GPL to LGPL.

Features 
 Theme support
 Systray support
 Kimpanel support (A D-Bus based protocol for input method user interface, oriented from KDE)
 KDE Configuration Module Support
 Global Simplified and Traditional Chinese Conversion support

Available input method engines

Available separate modules 
 punc: provides full-width punctuation support for CJK users.
 chttrans: provides simplified Chinese conversion to traditional Chinese.
 fullwidth: provides full-width character support.
 cloudpinyin: provides an extra candidate word from web for all Hanyu Pinyin input methods.
 fcitx-configtool: A GTK+ application for configuring fcitx.

See also
 Intelligent Input Bus
 uim

References

External links 
 Fcitx Homepage

Han character input